The Local Government and Public Involvement in Health Act 2007 (c 28) is an Act of the Parliament of the United Kingdom.

The Act allows for the implementation of many provisions outlined in the Government white paper Strong and Prosperous Communities including changes to local government in England. One provision is that civil parishes may now be established in the London boroughs.

The Bill for this Act
The Bill for this Act had its third reading in the House of Commons on 22 May 2007 and in the House of Lords on 22 October 2007. It received Royal Assent on 30 October.

Provisions

Part 1 Structural and boundary change in England
This Part came into force on 1 November 2007, subject to certain savings.

Part 17 Final provisions

Section 245 - Commencement
Orders made under this section:
The Local Government and Public Involvement in Health Act 2007 (Commencement No. 1 and Savings) Order 2007 (S.I. 2007/3136 (C.125)) - Made on 31 October 2007
The Local Government and Public Involvement in Health Act 2007 (Commencement No.2 and Savings) Order 2008 (S.I. 2008/172 (C.4))
The Local Government and Public Involvement in Health Act 2007 (Commencement No. 3, Transitional and Saving Provisions and Commencement No. 2 (Amendment)) Order 2008 (S.I. 2008/337 (C.13))
The Local Government and Public Involvement in Health Act 2007 (Commencement No.4) Order 2008 (S.I. 2008/461 (C.17))
The Local Government and Public Involvement in Health Act 2007 (Commencement No.5 and Transitional, Saving and Transitory Provision) Order 2008 (S.I. 2008/917 (C.44))
The Local Government and Public Involvement in Health Act 2007 (Commencement No. 6 and Transitional and Saving Provision) Order 2008 (S.I. 2008/1265 (C.54))
The Local Government and Public Involvement in Health Act 2007 (Commencement No.7) Order 2008 (S.I. 2008/2434 (C.105))
The Local Government and Public Involvement in Health Act 2007 (Commencement No. 8) Order 2008 (S.I. 2008/3110 (C.134))
The Local Government and Public Involvement in Health Act 2007 (Commencement No.9) Order 2010 (S.I. 2010/112 (C.12))
The Local Government and Public Involvement in Health Act 2007 (Commencement No. 1) (England) Order 2009 (S.I. 2009/959 (C.58))
The Local Government and Public Involvement in Health Act 2007 (Commencement) (Wales) Order 2008 (S.I. 2008/591 (W.60))
The Local Government and Public Involvement in Health Act 2007 (Commencement No. 2) (Wales) Order 2009 (S.I. 2009/2539 (W.203) (C.105))

Impact in Wales
Schedule 17 of the Act amends Schedule 5 of the Government of Wales Act 2006 therefore giving the National Assembly for Wales legislative competence in the sphere of local government. These powers will allow the Assembly to pass Assembly Measures that can change the structure, boundaries and composition of local councils in Wales.

See also
Local Government Act

References
Halsbury's Statutes,

External links
Bill home page

United Kingdom Acts of Parliament 2007
Local government legislation in England and Wales
NHS legislation